Robert "Bobby" Martin (born June 29, 1948) is an American singer, songwriter and multi-instrumentalist born in Philadelphia, Pennsylvania. Martin sings and plays keyboards, horn, saxophones and other instruments. He is mainly known for collaborating in the 1980s with the musician Frank Zappa, although he is also a prominent session musician, composer of music for cinema, theater, television and advertising, musical director and music teacher. He also directs music production company Think Method Production with Stephen Boyd. He recognizes as musical influences Ray Charles, Stravinsky, Coltrane, Rachmaninoff, Mose Allison, Cannonball Adderley, David "Fathead" Newman, Steely Dan, Frank Zappa and Etta James.

Biography

Childhood
Martin was born in Philadelphia in June 1948, the son of opera singers. His grandmother worked at RCA in Trenton, New Jersey, giving Robert access to a variety of 78 RPM  records. Growing up in the 1950s in this city, and with a deeply musical atmosphere at home, he was exposed to a broad spectrum of music. "The first piece of music I remember hearing, identifying and asking for was The Firebird by Stravinsky. I used to ask my mom to play that piece – it was the most intensely visual music I had ever heard." Apart from the exposure to classical music he gained through his parents and through performances of the Philadelphia Orchestra, he also listened to other kinds of music. His father was a fan of Big Band music, he regularly watched Dick Clark's American Bandstand show, and he listened to the excellent jazz that was played in the city's clubs. The presence of avant-garde rock and Philadelphia soul in his discography exemplify the breadth of his musical life.

He began his interest in music very early. At home his parents had a Lester Spinet piano, and as soon as he was tall enough to reach the keys, he taught himself to play by ear. "I recognized chord progressions and melodies, and I could reproduce them after I had listened to them." He started taking piano lessons at age 8, although he already knew how to play and compose blues. After learning to read music he left the lessons, because "I preferred what I was able to learn on my own." He is completely self-taught with his voice and with almost all the instruments, especially the wind of metal and wood, except the french horn, which he perfected at the Curtis Institute of Music. While he was an outstanding student at high school, a member of the National Honor Society, and an accomplished sportsman (a wrestling champion and excellent baseball player who considered playing professionally), he preferred to pursue music.

Martin learned to play french horn in elementary school. When he was in third grade, students were given a test to choose pupils for the band. He got a perfect score on the test and was given a french horn in fourth grade at age nine. A few years later he became passionate about the blues and wanted to play the saxophone after listening to Ray Charles saxophonist David "Fathead" Newman. Finally at age 13 he persuaded the head of the band to let him play the saxophone. After a few weeks he had learned the instrument well enough to become the main tenor of the band.

In 1969, Martin entered the Curtis Institute of Music where he undertook intensive classical studies. In Curtis, he had Mason Jones, the principal french horn orchestra interpreter of the Philadelphia Orchestra, as teacher, and he performed the classical repertoire under the baton of Eugene Ormandy, Claudio Abbado, Lorin Maazel and Seiji Ozawa.

Career
Martin began his professional career in his own city, before heading to the west coast. He performed as a session musician in recording studios at Sigma Sound Studios in Philadelphia. Between 1969 and 1974, Martin interpreted the french horn in a variety of successes of that time. At this stage he played on many records that helped to establish the Philadelphia soul sound, such as "Me and Mrs. Jones", "Back Stabbers", "Love Train", and "If You Don't Know Me by Now". He can be heard on records produced by the successful team of producers and songwriters Gamble and Huff of Philadelphia International Records. There he played horn on many sessions arranged by another well known Bobby Martin, the gifted TSOP arranger, producer and composer of the label.

Regarding his role as singer, Etta James was his great mentor, who encouraged him to sing with her in her live performances over a period of fifteen years.

In the 1970s he was part of Orleans, a group from Woodstock.

In 1978 he performed horn and saxophone on two Justin Hayward songs on the Moody Blues Octave album.

In 1981 Dave Robb, top technician on the road crew for Orleans in the 1970s, told Robert that Frank Zappa needed a musician for the 1981 tour. He was scheduled to audition the next day. In the audition Zappa put Robert to the test on keyboards, tenor saxophone and horn. He asked him to transpose keyboard parts to horn and saxophone, as well as follow polyrhythms and metric modulations. But it was Martin's vocal ability that secured his place in the band, especially his ability to sing melodies an octave higher than expected in natural voice, without the need of falsetto. He subsequently performed on all Zappa's tours and albums until the last tour in 1988.

Between tours with Zappa, he obtained the position of musical director for Cybill Shepherd and Bette Midler, and worked with Paul McCartney, Michael McDonald, Stevie Nicks, Boz Scaggs, Etta James (on tour with The Rolling Stones), Patti LaBelle, Bonnie Raitt , Kenny Loggins, and many others.

Since 1986, Martin has owned and operated his own studio and has diversified into programming, engineering, mixing, mastering and producing music for advertising, film and television.

In 1986 he toured with Michael McDonald.

In 1987 he performed on, arranged and coproduced the album American Soul Man for Wilson Pickett on Motown Records.

Martin is a member of the group Banned From Utopia, a band of former Frank Zappa musicians dedicated to the interpretation of Zappa's music. It consists of:

 Robert (Bobby) Martin -Frank Zappa 1981–88 – vocals, keyboards, sax, french horn
 Ray White – Frank Zappa 1978–84 – vocals, guitar.
 Tom Fowler – Frank Zappa 1973–75, 1978 – bass.
 Albert Wing – Frank Zappa 1988 – tenor saxophone and EWI.
 Robbie Mangano – guitar, vocals.
 Joel Taylor – drums.

In 2009, 2010, 2011 and 2012, Martin was a special guest at Zappanale in Bad Doberan, Germany. In 2010, he performed with Collectif LeBocal and The Central Scrutinizer Band.

He composed the music for the CBS television program Cybill, and was the show's musical director. While working on the show he became the partner of its star, Cybill Shepherd. He also composed for Baywatch, Martial Law and three seasons of the Lifetime Television program Intimate Portrait. Regarding this aspect of his musical life Martin has stated that it served to "pay the bills".

Discography
 Discography on AllMusic
 Discography on United Mutations

References

External links

1948 births
Living people
American multi-instrumentalists
American rock singers
American rock musicians
American keyboardists
American male singers
American rock saxophonists
American male saxophonists
21st-century American saxophonists
21st-century American male musicians
Orleans (band) members
Curtis Institute of Music alumni